Dawson's Creek is an American television series that premiered on January 20, 1998, on television network The WB. It was created by Kevin Williamson, who was the executive producer until the end of the show's second season. Paul Stupin shared the executive producer role until Williamson left, and remained until the series finale along with Tom Kapinos and Greg Prange. It is produced by Outerbanks Entertainment and Sony Pictures Television.

The series stars James Van Der Beek as Dawson Leery, an aspiring filmmaker. Katie Holmes and Joshua Jackson portray his childhood friends Joey Potter and Pacey Witter, respectively. Michelle Williams plays Jen Lindley, the new girl to Capeside from New York City. Kerr Smith plays Jack McPhee, a teen who struggles with his sexuality; Meredith Monroe plays overachiever Andie McPhee; and Busy Philipps plays Joey's college roommate Audrey Liddell. Rounding out the cast are Mary-Margaret Humes and John Wesley Shipp as Gail and Mitch Leery, Dawson's parents; Nina Repeta as Bessie Potter, Joey's older sister and legal guardian due to their mother's fatal cancer and father's incarceration for blue-collar crime; and Mary Beth Peil as Evelyn "Grams" Ryan, Jen's maternal grandmother and legal guardian in Capeside.

Between January 20, 1998, and May 14, 2003, Dawson's Creek aired for six seasons on the WB, the first season being a mid-season replacement and the following five as regular seasons. 128 episodes were produced over the show's six-year run, and concluded with a two-hour series finale. All six seasons are available on DVD in Regions 1, 2 and 4.

Series overview

Episodes

Season 1 (1998)
"No. in series" refers to the episode's number in the overall series; "No. in season" refers to the episode's number in this particular season. The first season, 13 episodes, ran from January 20, 1998, to May 19, 1998. The episodes were shot in 1997, before the series premiered. The first season takes place during what is approximately the first three months of the characters' sophomore year.

Season 2 (1998–1999)
The second season ran from October 7, 1998, to May 26, 1999. This season picks up immediately where season one left off and follows the characters through the remainder of their sophomore year.

Season 3 (1999–2000)
Season 3 aired from September 29, 1999, to May 24, 2000, and features 23 episodes. This season takes place during the characters' junior year of high school in Capeside. There were several cast changes from season 2. Kerr Smith and Meredith Monroe joined the main cast as Jack and Andie McPhee, respectively. The two had previously held special guest star roles in the previous season with Smith appearing in twenty episodes and Monroe appearing in twenty-one.

Season 4 (2000–2001)
Dawson's Creek fourth season started on October 4, 2000, and ended on May 23, 2001. This season takes place during the characters' senior year of high school in Capeside.

Meredith Monroe left the series after episode, "You Had Me at Goodbye", but continued to be credited episodes remaining in the season, returning only to participate in the episode "The Graduate".

Season 5 (2001–2002)
Season 5 started on October 10, 2001, and ended May 15, 2002. The season takes place during the characters' freshman year of college in Boston.

Season 6 (2002–2003)
The sixth and final season of Dawson's Creek began October 2, 2002, and ended May 14, 2003, with a special two-hour series finale. The season takes place during the characters' sophomore year of college and the series finale takes place five years later. The show saw the addition of Busy Philipps as Audrey Lidell, who previously guest starred throughout the entire fifth season.

Ratings

References

General
Dawson's Creek: The Complete First Season (2003-04-01) from Sony Pictures Home Entertainment
Dawson's Creek: The Complete Second Season (2003-12-16) from Sony Pictures Home Entertainment
Dawson's Creek: The Complete Third Season (2004-06-29) from Sony Pictures Home Entertainment
Dawson's Creek: The Complete Fourth Season (2004-10-05) from Sony Pictures Home Entertainment
Dawson's Creek: The Complete Fifth Season (2005-05-03) from Sony Pictures Home Entertainment
Dawson's Creek: The Complete Sixth Season (2006-04-04) from Sony Pictures Home Entertainment

Notes

External links

Dawson's Creek
Dawson's Creek